SkyCube was an American crowdsourced CubeSat. It was first announced on Kickstarter on 14 July 2012 and successfully funded on 12 September 2012, meeting its US$82,500 goal with a total of US$116,890. It was developed and built in 2012–2013, completed flight integration at Nanoracks in late 2013, and launched aboard the Cygnus CRS Orb-1 flight at the Mid-Atlantic Regional Spaceport on Wallops Island, Virginia on 9 January 2014. SkyCube was deployed from the International Space Station on 28 February 2014. Contact with the satellite was last made on 27 March 2014. SkyCube re-entered the Earth's atmosphere on 9 November 2014. It is one of several crowdfunded satellites launched during the 2010s.

Mission 
SkyCube had three major mission components: the broadcast of messages from its radio, the capture of pictures from space via its three cameras, and the deployment of a large balloon.

Messages 
The SkyCube radio emitted periodic beaconing pings which contained 120-byte messages from the Kickstarter backers. These pings were transmitted at 915 MHz, using the AX.25 protocol at 9600 baud with BPSK modulation, with a callsign of WG9XMF.

Imaging 
Using its three cameras, SkyCube intended to take pictures of the Earth from orbit. The cameras were VGA resolution and had lenses with three different fields of view (120°, 35°, and 6°), giving a variety of imaging possibilities. The images would have been transmitted back to Earth at 57.6 kbit/s. Kickstarter backers chose when the pictures were taken. National Oceanic and Atmospheric Administration (NOAA) granted a 90-day imaging license to SkyCube on 1 February 2013.

Balloon 
SkyCube would have deployed a large balloon at the end of its mission. The balloon was coated with reflective titanium dioxide and made it visible from the ground. The balloon increased the atmospheric drag on SkyCube, and within two weeks the orbit would have decayed enough for SkyCube to enter Earth's atmosphere and burn up safely. The inflation was intended to be triggered via 4-gram CO2 canister.

Mission Failure 
Several attempts were made to establish connection with the satellite, following its deployment. Initial attempts failed, but eventually basic telemetry was received, which indicated that at least one solar panel failed to deploy. However, subsequent communication attempts were made to send commands to the satellite, but none created a response. The fact that the satellite's orbit did not decay as quickly as those other CubeSats launched indicates that it experienced less drag, which also supports the conclusion that there was not a sufficient solar panel deployment.

Technical specifications

Partnerships 
SkyCube relied on several partners to provide necessary services:

Further reading 
 SkyCube was featured on the 9 May 2013 broadcast of ABC7 KGO-TV news 
 SkyCube: a social space mission
 SkyCube is a small crowdfunded satellite

See also 

 List of CubeSats

References

External links 
 SkyCube Satellite Technology at the website of Southern Stars (archived version on the Wayback Machine) 
SkyCube: The First Satellite Launched by You! at Kickstarter
 SkyCube Picture Album

CubeSats
Kickstarter-funded spacecraft
Spacecraft launched in 2014
Spacecraft which reentered in 2014
Satellites deployed from the International Space Station
Secondary payloads